Active Gaming Media Inc. (AGM) is a localization company based in Osaka, Japan. Founded in 2008 by CEO Ibai Ameztoy, the company's main focus lies in providing localization services for video games. AGM has since branched out to provide services such as game debugging, marketing, promotion, voice acting, and publishing for games and anime.

Having worked on a number of titles for various platforms including PlayStation 3, PS Vita, PC, as well as online and mobile games, AGM has collaborated with a number of major Japanese video game companies, including Sony Corporation, Grasshopper Manufacture and Capcom. Notable titles are Demon’s Souls, No More Heroes, Monster Hunter, the survival-horror series Resident Evil, and the Devil May Cry series.

In May 2011, AGM launched the Japan-based version of the Playism website, an indie game distribution platform. With the aim of introducing Western indie games to Japan, Playism started off by distributing localized versions of Machinarium and SpaceChem. Aside from being a distribution platform, Playism offers indie game funding, localization, and publishing services for indie game developers. Along with the English release of Nigoro’s archaeological platformer La-Mulana, Playism launched the English version of the Playism store in July 2012. In addition to both paid and free indie games, Playism also offers a Pay what you want system for some of its titles. The platform adapts a concept similar to Steam.

History
2008
Established as a legal entity in Tokyo
2009
Headquarters moved to Osaka.
2011
Acquired Tokyo Great Visual (Osaka branch), headquarters relocated within Osaka
Launched digital distribution platform Playism in Japan
2012
Active Gaming Media's CEO Ibai Ameztoy was included on Gamasutra's 2012 "Power 50" list of influential people in the video game industry.
2016
Launched the YumeHaven brand, which focuses on the localization of Japanese visual novels.
2016
Launched English gaming media website AUTOMATON WEST.

Completed projects
Over the past five years, AGM has translated more than 300 games titles for six different platforms into nine languages.

References

External links

Video game companies of Japan
Companies based in Osaka
Translation companies
Video game companies established in 2008
Japanese companies established in 2008
Video game localization